Soldadu Affendy bin Haji Akup (born 16 February 1985) is a Bruneian footballer who plays as a defender.  

Affendy was the team captain of MS ABDB, the football team of the Royal Brunei Armed Forces. In 2005, he had a two-year stint with DPMM FC, at that time playing in the Malaysia Premier League, but was released along with Zulkefly Duraman and Rosmini Kahar to make way for four Malaysian players. He has lifted the domestic FA Cup with MS ABDB for six consecutive times.   

Affendy made his debut for the national team in the 2008 AFC Challenge Cup qualification, losing 0-1 to the Philippines on 13 May. He was ever-present in the 2012 AFF Suzuki Cup qualifying, as well as substitute appearances in both legs of the 2018 World Cup qualifiers against Chinese Taipei in March 2015.

Honours
MS ABDB
 Brunei Super League (3): 2015, 2016, 2017–18
 Brunei FA Cup (6): 2007–08, 2009–10, 2012, 2014–15, 2015, 2016
 Brunei League Cup: 2006

References

External links

1985 births
Living people
Association football defenders
Bruneian military personnel
DPMM FC players
Bruneian footballers
Brunei international footballers
MS ABDB players